Rachów may refer to the following places:
The Polish name for the town of Rakhiv, Zakarpattia Oblast, Ukraine
Rachów village in Gmina Malczyce, Środa Śląska County in Lower Silesian Voivodeship, Poland
Annopol-Rachów former village now part of the town of Annopol in Kraśnik county, Lublin Voivodeship, Poland